{{DISPLAYTITLE:C11H22O2}}
The molecular formula C11H22O2 (molar mass: 186.29 g/mol, exact mass: 186.1620 u) may refer to:

 Pentyl hexanoate
 Undecylic acid, or undecanoic acid